Signet Armorlite, an optical company owned by Essilor, recently celebrated its 60th anniversary since incorporation. The headquarters, U.S. distribution center and lens technology center, Signetek, are located in San Marcos, California. Glass lenses and molds are designed and produced at Crossbows Optical, a wholly owned subsidiary located in Northern Ireland. European product distribution is achieved through two distribution centers and four optical laboratories located in England, Germany, Spain, and the Netherlands. Signet Armorlite holds worldwide distribution for KODAK Lenses and is an Authorized Distributor for 3M Optical Supplies in the United States.

History

1947: Dr. Robert Graham

In 1947, Signet Armorlite (SA) was founded in Burbank, California, by Dr. Robert Graham shortly after the end of World War II.  Armorlite pioneered plastic (CR-39) lens casting in North America.  Since then, Signet Armorlite has brought to the market a wide range of lens designs and proprietary lens materials, coatings and technologies

1993: KODAK licensing agreement

Eastman Kodak Company issued a licensing agreement to Signet Armorlite for the exclusive right to use the KODAK brand for premium ophthalmic lenses.  Since that time, over fifty ophthalmic products have been developed under the KODAK Lens brand.

2002: KODAK Precise Progressive

In 2002, the award-winning KODAK Precise Progressive debuted.  This new product was developed using a new patented approach to progressive design, called Vision First Design.  With this technology, the traditional design methodology is actually reversed.  Instead of calculating the lens surface and then measuring the results, Signet Armorlite designers start by defining the optical properties that constitute superb vision and letting those calculations determine the corresponding lens surface.  The resulting smooth, continuous power increase across the entire lens provides significant improvements in visual performance, including stable peripheral vision and rapid recognition of objects in the periphery.

2006-Early 2010: Signetek

In March 2006, Signetek, a division of SA, began processing SA lenses.  This multimillion-dollar facility contains the newest technology for digital surfacing-to-prescription and coating application.  Signetek processes all KODAK Lens and Signet Armorlite products.

Among the first new products produced by Signetek is the award-winning KODAK CleAR Anti-Reflective Coating and the digitally surfaced backside progressive KODAK Unique Lens.  This new lens design was created with Vision First Design and offers six corridor lengths, selected by sophisticated software based on B measurements and frame size.  By November 2009, 50 lens materials are available in the KODAK Unique Lens design.

Signetek produced a new generation anti-reflective coating: KODAK Clean'N'CleAR Lens.  This treatment offers additional anti-static properties and a slicker top coat that takes clean lenses to a new level.  Currently, KODAK CleAR Lenses are offered by Signetek and other authorized labs while KODAK Clean'N'CleAR Lenses remain exclusive to Signetek.

In April 2009, Signet Armorlite once again made headway with a new major development: KODAK Lenses with Anti-Fatigue Progressive Technology.  This unprecedented technology provides relief for eyestrain symptoms in presbyopia.

The concept of incorporating base-in prism in a progressive design to relieve convergence insufficiency (CI) symptoms was conceived and patented by Dr. Jeffrey Krall (Mitchell, SD).  An alliance was formed with SA in 2007 to make this idea a reality.  In a combined effort between the Illinois College of Optometry and SA's Crossbows Facility, a double-blind study was conducted during 2008 to document the effects of base-in prism to relieve CI symptoms in a test group of presbyopia.  With test results proving the concept, Crossbows engineering staff developed the patented technology offered through Signetek in KODAK Unique, Precise, Precise Short and Concise Progressive Lenses.

In 2010, Signetek incorporated finishing services into its offering as well as an array of new digital products:

 KODAK Precise, Precise Short and Concise Progressives with precision three-dimensional backside improvements for great visual acuity under the umbrella name of KODAK Digital Progressive Lenses.
 The KODAK Unique MonitorView Lens is a backside variable-focus design for computer and near-viewing.
 A full backside progressive design in two corridor lengths, DirecTek Progressive addresses the need for an economical digital lens alternative.

2010: Essilor acquisition

In April, 2010, Essilor completed the acquisition of Signet Armorlite.

References

External links

Optics manufacturing companies